Iowa Highway 137 (Iowa 137) is a  state highway in southern Iowa. The route begins at Iowa 5 in Albia and ends at U.S. Highway 63 (US 63) and Iowa 163 in Eddyville.  The highway was designated in the 1930s after US 63 was rerouted.

Route description
Iowa 137 begins at a Y intersection with Iowa 5 on the north side of Albia. From Albia, it travels north for  before turning northeast towards Eddyville. The highway ends at an interchange with US 63 and Iowa 163 on Eddyville's southeast corner.

History
Iowa 137 was designated in 1934 to replace a segment of Iowa 59 that was not subsumed into US 63. Previously, US 63's northern end was in Des Moines, but it was shifted that year to follow Iowa 59 north of Oskaloosa. In 1997, US 63 was again rerouted, this time onto a new four-lane highway, between Ottumwa and Oskaloosa. The new US 63 highway was built along Iowa 137 and Iowa 23, north and south of Eddyville, respectively. Iowa 137 was truncated to its current extent when the expressway opened on July 16, 1997.

Major intersections

References

External links

End of Iowa 137 at Iowa Highway Ends

137